The Gambia Moral Congress (abbreviated GMC) is a political party in the Gambia. The party was founded by the lawyer Mai Ahmad Fatty in 2009. The motto of the party is People Power for Human Rights and Economic Justice. The GMC was part of the Coalition 2016 for the 2016 presidential election, where Adama Barrow was declared the coalition's candidate and subsequently won. Mai Ahmad Fatty is the interior minister of the current government. He previously served as Barrow's personal adviser during the political impasse.

Electoral history

Presidential elections

National Assembly elections

References

Political parties established in 2009
Political parties in the Gambia